Japan competed in the 2012 Asian Beach Games in Haiyang, China from June 12 to June 22, 2012. The delegation was bannered by 82 athletes. Japan send their representatives in 7 sports including beach soccer, beach volleyball, beach handball, sport climbing, dragon boat, roller speed skating, and water skiing.

The delegation collected a gold, three silver, and two bronze medals at the game. The medals came from only two sports, sport climbing and water skiing. The only gold for the country achieved by Atsushi Shimizu in men's bouldering event at sport climbing. The sport also got three silver medals from Tsukuru Hori, Sachi Anma, and Akiyo Noguchi. While the bronze came from sport climber Yuka Kobayashi and water skier Hiroko Komori.

Medallist

|  style="text-align:left; width:78%; vertical-align:top;"|

|  style="text-align:left; width:22%; vertical-align:top;"|

Competitors

Beach handball

Beach soccer

Beach volleyball

Roller speed skating

Sport climbing

Waterskiing

See also
 Japan at the Asian Games

References

Nations at the 2012 Asian Beach Games
2012 in Japanese sport